Takashi Yamamoto is the name of:
Takashi Yamamoto (swimmer) (born 1978), Japanese swimmer
Takashi Yamamoto (politician) (1949–2007), Japanese politician of the Democratic Party of Japan
Takashi Yamamoto (pianist), Japanese pianist